Sir Charles Lockhart-Ross, 7th Baronet (c. 1763 – 8 February 1814) was a Scottish landowner, politician, and officer in the British Army.

Sir Charles was the oldest son of Sir John Lockhart Ross, 6th Baronet, of Balnagown by Elizabeth Baillie, the daughter of Robert Dundas of Edinburgh. He succeeded his father as 7th Baronet on 9 June 1790.

He joined the army in 1780 as a cornet in the 7th Dragoons, rising to the rank of Lieutenant-General by 1805. Towards the end of his military career he was given the colonelcy of the 86th (The Leinster) Regiment of Foot in 1806, transferring in 1810 as colonel to be colonel of the 37th (North Hampshire) Regiment of Foot, a post he held until his death in 1814.

Lockhart-Ross was also a wealthy landowner whose mother had bequeathed him large estates in both Lanarkshire and Ross-shire, the latter giving him control of the royal burgh of Tain.He was elected at a by-election in June 1786 as the Member of Parliament for the Tain district of Burghs and was re-elected in the 1790. In 1796 he was returned for Ross-shire, which returned him again in 1802. At the 1806 election he was returned for the Linlithgow Burghs, where he was defeated in 1807.

He married twice, first in 1788 to Matilda Theresa, daughter of James Lockhart-Wishart of Lanarkshire, a Count of Holy Roman Empire and officer in the Austrian army. After her death in 1791 he married again in 1799, to Lady Mary Rebecca Fitzgerald, daughter of the 2nd Duke of Leinster. He had a son, who died young, and a daughter in the first marriage and two sons and five daughters in the second. He was succeeded by his son, Sir Charles William Frederick Augustus Lockhart-Ross, 8th Baronet.

References

External links 
 

|-

|-

1763 births
Year of birth uncertain
1814 deaths
People from Ross and Cromarty
Baronets in the Baronetage of Nova Scotia
Scottish landowners
British Army lieutenant generals
7th Queen's Own Hussars officers
Members of the Parliament of Great Britain for Scottish constituencies
British MPs 1784–1790
British MPs 1790–1796
British MPs 1796–1800
Members of the Parliament of the United Kingdom for Scottish constituencies
UK MPs 1801–1802
UK MPs 1802–1806
UK MPs 1806–1807